Percy Stanley Hunt (12 November 1922 – 9 March 1985) was an Australian rules footballer who played with Geelong in the Victorian Football League (VFL).

Prior to his VFL career, he served in the Australian Army in World War II.

Notes

External links 

1922 births
1985 deaths
Australian rules footballers from Victoria (Australia)
Geelong Football Club players
Ballarat Football Club players
Australian Army personnel of World War II
Australian Army soldiers